The Sam Rayburn Tollway (formerly the State Highway 121 Tollway) is a tollway operated by the North Texas Tollway Authority that runs from Grapevine to McKinney. Its frontage road are signed State Highway 121.

The original portion of the toll road from Business 121 near Coppell to FM 2281 opened in May 2006, and toll collection started December 1 of that year. The tolled portion extended to Hillcrest Road in Plano/Frisco on August 31, 2008.  The tollway was extended to Custer Road on September 1, 2009, and again to Hardin Boulevard in McKinney on October 1, 2009.

The tollway (formerly named 121 Tollway) was renamed in honor of Sam Rayburn at a North Texas Tollway Authority meeting on March 16, 2009.

The tollway also currently features two five-level stack interchanges, at Dallas North Tollway and Interstate 35E /US 77.

History 
The Sam Rayburn Tollway project was divided into five segments, all of which have been completed.
 Segment 1, from Denton Tap Road to Old Denton Road, opened to traffic in July 2006.
 Segment 2, which runs from Old Denton Road to Hillcrest Road, officially opened to traffic on September 1, 2008, when NTTA took full responsibility for Segments 1 and 2 as well as the operation, maintenance and construction of the remaining segments of the SRT.
 NTTA contractors began work on Segment 3 of the SRT in March 2008. On September 1, 2009, the NTTA opened the main lanes from Hillcrest Road to just east of Custer Road. On September 29, 2009, the NTTA opened the main lanes from just east of Custer Road to west of Hardin Boulevard.
 Segment 4 encompasses the Sam Rayburn Tollway/U.S. 75 interchange, from west of Hardin Boulevard to just east of U.S. 75. Construction on this portion of the corridor began in December 2008. Four major direct-connecting ramps were open to traffic in December 2010. The last two ramps were opened in March 2011.
 The Sam Rayburn Tollway/Dallas North Tollway interchange is referred to as Segment 5. The NTTA began construction on Segment 5 in February 2010. It was completed in 2012.

Exit list
Almost all exits include access to SH 121, which follows the frontage roads. Due to the nearly continuous frontage road, most exits on the Tollway serve more than one roadway.

References

External links

 A YouTube video sponsored by the NTTA as the official tour (from Grapevine to McKinney)

Toll roads in Texas
Transportation in Denton County, Texas
Transportation in Dallas County, Texas
Transportation in Collin County, Texas